Colvin Mountain is a ridge in Calhoun County and Etowah County, Alabama.

It is home to the Chack Family Homestead.

References

External links
Colvin Mountain

Landforms of Calhoun County, Alabama
Landforms of Etowah County, Alabama
Ridges of Alabama